Ivan Dewayne Hill is an American politician from Georgia. Hill is a Republican member of the Georgia House of Representatives from the 3rd District, serving since 2017. Hill has sponsored 18 bills.

Personal life 
Hill's wife is Wyondia Hill. They have six children. Hill and his family live in Ringgold, Georgia.

References

External links 
 Dewayne Hill at ballotpedia.org

Republican Party members of the Georgia House of Representatives
21st-century American politicians
Living people
People from Ringgold, Georgia
1950 births